The Holden–Parramore Historic District is a U.S. historic district located in Parramore neighborhood of west-central Orlando, Florida. The district is roughly bounded by W. Church Street, S. Division Avenue, Long Street, McFall Avenue, and S. Parramore Avenue.

It was added to the National Register of Historic Places on September 23, 2009.

References

National Register of Historic Places in Orange County, Florida
Historic districts on the National Register of Historic Places in Florida